This article documents the 1989–90 season of London football club Charlton Athletic F.C.

League table

Results

First Division

FA Cup

League Cup

Football League Trophy

Squad

References 

Charlton Athletic F.C. seasons
Charlton Athletic F.C.